Albert Angus Campbell (August 10, 1910 – December 15, 1980) was an American social psychologist best known for his research into electoral systems and for co-writing The American Voter with Philip Converse, Warren Miller, and Donald E. Stokes. Campbell published his work under the name Angus Campbell. He was a professor at the University of Michigan. He died in Ann Arbor, Michigan on December 15, 1980.

Bibliography
Campbell, Angus, Converse, Philip E., Miller, Warren E., Stokes, Donald E. (1960). The American Voter.
Campbell, Angus (1964). The American Voter, an Abridgment. New York: John Wiley and Sons.
Campbell, Angus (1966). Elections and the Political Order. New York: John Wiley and Sons.
Campbell, Angus, Gurin, Gerald, Miller, Warren E. (1971). The Voter Decides. New York: Praeger.
Campbell, Angus. (1971). White Attitudes Towards Black People. Institute for Social Research.
Campbell, Angus, and Converse, Philip E. (1972). The Human Meaning of Social Change. New York: Russell Sage Foundation.

References

Further reading

External links
Clyde H. Coombs, "Angus Campbell", Biographical Memoirs of the National Academy of Sciences (1987)

1910 births
1980 deaths
American social psychologists
University of Michigan faculty